Isaksen Island is a small island in Hinlopen Strait. It is part of the Rønnbeck Islands in the Svalbard archipelago. It lies east of Cape Weyprecht on Spitsbergen.

The wildlife consists largely of polar bears.

The island was discovered in 1867 by the Swedish-Norwegian polar explorer Nils Fredrik Rønnbeck. The island is named after the Norwegian skipper and ice-pilot Isak Nils Isaksen (1842–1920), who participated in several scientific expeditions in the Arctic.

References

Islands of Svalbard